Daton Duain Fix (born March 11, 1998) is an American freestyle and folkstyle wrestler who competes internationally at 61 kilograms, and collegiately at 133 pounds. In freestyle, he was the 2021 World Championship runner-up, the 2019 Pan American Games gold medalist, the 2022 Pan American Continental champion and is a two-time US World Team Member (2019 and 2021). In the age-group, he was the 2017 Junior World Champion (three-time medalist) and 2014 Youth Olympic silver medalist. In folkstyle, he is a three-time NCAA Division I National runner–up, and a four time Big 12 Conference champion for the Oklahoma State Cowboys.

Folkstyle career

High school 
Fix attended Charles Page High School in Oklahoma, where he was coached by his father Derek ('83 Cadet World Champion) and Kelly Smith. There, he went undefeated throughout all of his high school career, compiling 168 wins and no losses, and racking up four state titles. Nationally, he was a multiple-time folkstyle US National champion.

College 
In November 2016, Fix, the number one recruit in the country pound-for-pound, committed to John Smith from the Oklahoma State University, staying in his local state of Oklahoma.

2017–2018 
As a redshirt athlete, Fix became the Reno Tournament champion, compiling notable victories over ninth-ranked Ronnie Bresser (who would go on to become an All-American later in the season) and eight-ranked Sean Fausz.

2018–2019 
During the 2018 part of the season, Fix won titles from the Oklahoma City Open and the Reno Tournament, and also went 5–0 in dual meets, compiling notable victories over returning two-time All-American and '17 NCAA runner-up Ethan Lizak and returning All-American Montorie Bridges. To kick off 2019, Fix claimed the Southern Scuffle title and went on to win three more dual meets, where he defeated returning NCAA runner-up Nick Suriano in one of them, although very controversially. Fix's first collegiate loss came shortly after, by the hands of Micky Phillippi, in a close 1–3 decision loss. He bounced back with a win over the nationally ranked Austin Gomez and five more dual wins, including victories over third-ranked Austin DeSanto and John Erneste (both would become All-Americans in the post-season), to end regular season as the top-ranked 133-pounder in the United States.

In the post-season, Fix went 4–0 at the Big 12 Conference Championships to claim the title and enter the NCAA's as the top-seed. At the NCAA tournament, Fix downed four opponents to make the finals, including the fifth and eight seeds Luke Pletcher and John Erneste. In the final, he faced Nick Suriano in an anticipated rematch, where after a very close match, Fix claimed runner-up honors when he was defeated after Suriano claimed two points during the second sudden victory period. He closed out the season with 34 wins and two losses.

2020–2021 
Fix did not compete in the NCAA in 2019–2020, as he took an Olympic redshirt to prepare for the US Olympic Team Trials. He was expected to compete for the Cowboys from the start of the season, however, his USADA suspension led him unable to, and became eligible on February 10, 2021, to return. Fix came back on February 14, winning one extra match by technical fall before pinning his way to the Cowboy Challenge title in three matches. In the final dual of the season, Fix claimed his fourth straight pin to roll into the post-season with an undefeated 5–0 record. At the Big 12 Conference Championships, Fix compiled four more wins to claim his second title, helping the Cowboys reach the team crown. At the NCAA's, Fix compiled three bonus points victories to make the semifinals, where he edged B1G runner-up and former All-American from Iowa Austin DeSanto to make his second final. In the finale he faced B1G champion and Penn State star Roman Bravo-Young, where after going into overtime, Fix was defeated the same way and by the same score as in his other finals match against Nick Suriano, once again claiming runner-up honors.

Freestyle career

Age-group 
As a cadet, Fix won two Cadet Pan American titles, in 2013 and 2014. That same year, he went on to place tenth at the Cadet World Championships and second at the Youth Summer Olympics. The following year (2015), he earned a bronze medal from the Cadet World Championships after making his second US World Team, and in 2016, Fix earned another bronze, now at the Junior World Championships. In 2017, Fix became a Junior World Champion, while sweeping all five opponents with a combined score of 53–1, with the lone point being surrendered at the finals, where he tech'd Russia's Ismail Gadzhiev 12–1. After making his fifth age-group US World Team, the returning World Champion was defeated in the semifinals, before coming back and earning his third World Championship bronze.

Senior level

2016–2017 
Fix won his first two senior matches at the 2016 and 2017 Beat the Streets events, against '13 Cadet World Championship bronze medalist from Iran Heirollah Ghahremani (TF 14–3) and Joey Melendez (TF 14–1). In October, Fix, who at this point had never wrestled an official collegiate match, became the US U23 World Team Member, with three wins on the Challenge Tournament, and two straight over NCAA DI champion and two-time All-American Nathan Tomasello in the best-of-three. At the U23 World Championships, Fix was eliminated in the opening match to place nineteenth.

2018 
To start off the year, the incoming Cowboy placed second at the US Open National Championships, losing to '14 NCAA champion Tony Ramos by criteria in the finals. He then went on to become a Final X contestant after dominantly winning the US World Team Trials Challenge Tournament. At Final X: Lincoln ('18), Fix dropped two straight matches to returning World Championship runner-up Thomas Gilman, losing his chance to make his first US World Team.

2019 
After his college freshman season was over, the '19 NCAA DI National runner-up won his first US Open National title, with wins over '18 US U23 National Champion Vito Arujau (TF 18–8) in the quarterfinals, '17 NCAA champion Darian Cruz (2–0) and Thomas Gilman in a rematch (8–4). As the US National champion, Fix sat out during the US World Team Trials Challenge Tournament, and waited for the winner to battle at Final X: Lincoln ('19). Fix ended up facing his rival Thomas Gilman at Final X, and after a dominant 9–1 victory in the first match, Fix was forced to go through a third match when he was defeated 2–3 by Gilman. Fix was able to drop Gilman with a 6–3 decision to make his first US World Team.

Fix then won the Pan American Games gold medal, with a notable victory over the heavily accomplished Cuban Reineri Andreu. At the World Championships, Fix started off dominant by tech'ing '19 European Championship bronze medalist Vladimir Egorov, but was subsequently defeated by '17 World Champion Yuki Takahashi, in a closely contested 2–4 loss. In October, it was announced that Fix would be taking an Olympic Redshirt instead of participating in NCAA wrestling for 2019–20.

2020 
After his run at the World Championships, Fix came back on January, at the Matteo Pellicone Ranking Series. After two wins, he was dropped twice, by his rival Thomas Gilman and Minghu Liu respectively, to place fifth.

Fix was then scheduled to compete at the '20 US Olympic Team Trials on April 4 at State College, Pennsylvania. However, the event was postponed for 2021 along with the Summer Olympics due to the COVID-19 pandemic, leaving all the qualifiers unable to compete.

On September, it was announced that Fix had been given a one-year long suspension by USADA, after failing a test for ostarine, which was retroactive to February 10, 2021, because his provisional suspension started on February 10, 2020. Fix claims that he ingested the substance when he drank from a contaminated water bottle, which his father Derek had prepared for himself and left in the refrigerator, before Daton drank it.

2021 
After his suspension was lifted and the NCAA season ended, Fix competed at the rescheduled US Olympic Team Trials in April 2 as the second seed, in an attempt to represent the United States at the 2020 Summer Olympics. After beating Sean Russell, he was defeated by Vito Arujau in the semifinals and subsequently forfeited out of the tournament.

Fix then registered to come back at the 2021 US World Team Trials on September 11–12, intending to represent the country at the World Championships at 61 kilograms. He made the best-of-three after a successful first day, tech'ing youngster Carter Young and NCAA champion Seth Gross, and neutralizing 2020 Pan American Champion Tyler Graff to advance. Fix repeated his 2019 feat and became a two-time US World Team Member, now at 61 kilos, by putting a clinic on NCAA champion Nathan Tomasello twice in a row. As a result, he represented the United States at the 2021 World Championships from October 2 to 3 in Oslo, Norway.

Fix had an outstanding first day, racking up 41 points to non against four opponents, including Individual World Cup medalist Georgi Vangelov and European Champion Arsen Harutyunyan, driving them to flawless technical falls. In the finale, he wrestled reigning Individual World Cup and European champion Abasgadzhi Magomedov for the gold medal, where he was closely defeated on points, claiming the silver medal.

2022 
Back from his stellar performance at the 2021 World Championships, Fix quickly dismantled World Championship competitor Giusseppe Rea from Colombia on February 12, at Bout at the Ballpark. A couple hours later, he downed fellow two-time All-American Austin DeSanto from Iowa in folkstyle, competing for the Cowboys. On May 8, he racked up the Pan American Championship.

Freestyle record 

! colspan="7"| Senior Freestyle Matches
|-
!  Res.
!  Record
!  Opponent
!  Score
!  Date
!  Event
!  Location
|-
! style=background:white colspan=7 |
|-
|Loss
|42–12
|align=left| Seth Gross
|style="font-size:88%"|5–9
|style="font-size:88%" rowspan=3|June 3, 2022
|style="font-size:88%" rowspan=3|2022 Final X: Stillwater
|style="text-align:left;font-size:88%;" rowspan=3| Stillwater, Oklahoma
|-
|Loss
|42–11
|align=left| Seth Gross
|style="font-size:88%"|4–5
|-
|Win
|42–10
|align=left| Seth Gross
|style="font-size:88%"|5–5
|-
! style=background:white colspan=7 |
|-
|Win
|41–10
|align=left| Logan Sloan
|style="font-size:88%"|Fall
|style="font-size:88%" rowspan=3|May 8, 2022
|style="font-size:88%" rowspan=3|2022 Pan American Continental Championships
|style="text-align:left;font-size:88%;" rowspan=3| Acapulco, Mexico
|-
|Win
|40–10
|align=left| Pedro Flores
|style="font-size:88%"|TF 10–0
|-
|Win
|39–10
|align=left| Joe Silva
|style="font-size:88%"|TF 11–0
|-
|Win
|38–10
|align=left| Giusseppe Rea
|style="font-size:88%"|TF 10–0
|style="font-size:88%"|February 12, 2022
|style="font-size:88%"|2022 Bout at the Ballpark
|style="text-align:left;font-size:88%;"|
 Arlington, Texas
|-
! style=background:white colspan=7 |
|-
|Loss
|37–10
|align=left| Abasgadzhi Magomedov
|style="font-size:88%"|1–4
|style="font-size:88%"|October 3, 2021
|style="font-size:88%" rowspan=5|2021 World Championships
|style="text-align:left;font-size:88%;" rowspan=5| Oslo, Norway
|-
|Win
|37–9
|align=left| Arsen Harutyunyan
|style="font-size:88%"|TF 10–0
|style="font-size:88%" rowspan=4|October 2, 2021
|-
|Win
|36–9
|align=left| Ravinder Dahiya
|style="font-size:88%"|TF 10–0
|-
|Win
|35–9
|align=left| Arman Eloyan
|style="font-size:88%"|TF 10–0
|-
|Win
|34–9
|align=left| Georgi Vangelov
|style="font-size:88%"|TF 11–0
|-
! style=background:white colspan=7 |
|-
|Win
|33–9
|align=left| Nathan Tomasello
|style="font-size:88%"|7–0
|style="font-size:88%" rowspan=2|September 12, 2021
|style="font-size:88%" rowspan=5|2021 US World Team Trials
|style="text-align:left;font-size:88%;" rowspan=5| Lincoln, Nebraska
|-
|Win
|32–9
|align=left| Nathan Tomasello
|style="font-size:88%"|8–3
|-
|Win
|31–9
|align=left| Tyler Graff
|style="font-size:88%"|2–0
|style="font-size:88%" rowspan=3|September 11, 2021
|-
|Win
|30–9
|align=left| Seth Gross
|style="font-size:88%"|TF 11–0
|-
|Win
|29–9
|align=left| Carter Young
|style="font-size:88%"|TF 13–2
|-
! style=background:white colspan=7 |
|-
|Loss
|28–9
|align=left| Vito Arujau
|style="font-size:88%"|5–7
|style="font-size:88%" rowspan=2|April 2–3, 2021
|style="font-size:88%" rowspan=2|2020 US Olympic Team Trials
|style="text-align:left;font-size:88%;" rowspan=2| Forth Worth, Texas
|-
|Win
|28–8
|align=left| Sean Russell
|style="font-size:88%"|TF 11–0
|-
! style=background:white colspan="7" | 
|-
|Loss
|27–8
|style="text-align:left" | Minghu Liu
|style="font-size:88%"|2–3
|style="font-size:88%" rowspan="4" |January 16, 2020
|style="font-size:88%" rowspan="4"|Matteo Pellicone Ranking Series 2020
|style="text-align:left;font-size:88%;" rowspan="4"|
 Rome, Italy
|-
|Loss
|27–7
| style="text-align:left" |  Thomas Gilman
|style="font-size:88%"|1–2
|-
|Win
|27–6
| style="text-align:left" |  Pedro Mejías
|style="font-size:88%"|TF 11–0
|-
|Win
|26–6
| style="text-align:left" |  Wanhao Zou
|style="font-size:88%"|7–1
|-
! style=background:white colspan="7" |
|-
|Loss
|25–6
| style="text-align:left" |  Yuki Takahashi
|style="font-size:88%"|2–4
|style="font-size:88%" rowspan="2" |September 19, 2019
|style="font-size:88%" rowspan="2" |2019 World Championships
|style="text-align:left;font-size:88%;" rowspan="2" |
 Nur-Sultan, Kazakhstan
|-
|Win
|25–5
| style="text-align:left" |  Vladimir Egorov
|style="font-size:88%"|TF 12–1
|-
! style=background:white colspan="7" | 
|-
|Win
|24–5
| style="text-align:left" |  Juan Rubelín Ramírez
|style="font-size:88%"|6–3
|style="font-size:88%" rowspan="3" |August 9, 2019
|style="font-size:88%" rowspan="3" |2019 Pan American Games
|style="text-align:left;font-size:88%;" rowspan="3" |
 Lima, Peru
|-
|Win
|23–5
| style="text-align:left" |  Reineri Andreu
|style="font-size:88%"|4–1
|-
|Win
|22–5
| style="text-align:left" |  Pedro Mejías
|style="font-size:88%"|TF 10–0
|-
! style=background:white colspan="7" | 
|-
|Win
|21–5
| style="text-align:left" |  Thomas Gilman
|style="font-size:88%"|6–3
|style="font-size:88%" rowspan="3" |June 14–15, 2019
|style="font-size:88%" rowspan="3" |2019 Final X: Lincoln
|style="text-align:left;font-size:88%;" rowspan="3" |
 Lincoln, Nebraska
|-
|Loss
|20–5
| style="text-align:left" |  Thomas Gilman
|style="font-size:88%"|2–3
|-
|Win
|20–4
| style="text-align:left" |  Thomas Gilman
|style="font-size:88%"|9–1
|-
! style=background:white colspan="7" | 
|-
|Win
|19–4
| style="text-align:left" |  Thomas Gilman
|style="font-size:88%"|8–4
|style="font-size:88%" rowspan="6" |April 24–27, 2019
|style="font-size:88%" rowspan="6" |2019 US Open National Championships
|style="text-align:left;font-size:88%;" rowspan="6" |
 Las Vegas, Nevada
|-
|Win
|18–4
| style="text-align:left" |  Darian Cruz
|style="font-size:88%"|2–0
|-
|Win
|17–4
| style="text-align:left" |  Vitali Arujau
|style="font-size:88%"|TF 18–8
|-
|Win
|16–4
| style="text-align:left" |  Graham Shore
|style="font-size:88%"|8–0
|-
|Win
|15–4
| style="text-align:left" |  James Hicks
|style="font-size:88%"|TF 10–0
|-
|Win
|14–4
| style="text-align:left" |  Ian Timmins
|style="font-size:88%"|TF 12–1
|-
! style=background:white colspan="7" | 
|-
|Loss
|13–4
| style="text-align:left" |  Thomas Gilman
|style="font-size:88%"|1–2
|style="font-size:88%" rowspan="5" |June 9–10, 2018
|style="font-size:88%" rowspan="2" |2018 Final X: Lincoln
|style="text-align:left;font-size:88%;" rowspan="5" |
 Lincoln, Nebraska
|-
|Loss
|13–3
| style="text-align:left" |  Thomas Gilman
|style="font-size:88%"|3–6
|-
|Win
|13–2
| style="text-align:left" |  Zach Sanders
|style="font-size:88%"|TF 10–0
|style="font-size:88%" rowspan="3" |2018 US World Team Trials Challenge Tournament
|-
|Win
|12–2
| style="text-align:left" |  Zane Richards
|style="font-size:88%"|9–2
|-
|Win
|11–2
| style="text-align:left" |  Eddie Klimara
|style="font-size:88%"|TF 14–2
|-
! style=background:white colspan="7" | 
|-
|Loss
|10–2
| style="text-align:left" |  Tony Ramos
|style="font-size:88%"|2–2
|style="font-size:88%" rowspan="4"|April 24–28, 2018
|style="font-size:88%" rowspan="4"|2018 US Open National Championships
|style="text-align:left;font-size:88%;" rowspan="4"|
 Las Vegas, Nevada
|-
|Win
|10–1
| style="text-align:left" |  David Terao
|style="font-size:88%"|TF 10–0
|-
|Win
|9–1
| style="text-align:left" |  Daniel Deshazer
|style="font-size:88%"|4–0
|-
|Win
|8–1
| style="text-align:left" |  Britain Longmire
|style="font-size:88%"|TF 10–0
|-
! style=background:white colspan="7" |
|-
|Loss
|7–1
| style="text-align:left" |  Parviz Ibrahimov
|style="font-size:88%"|2–5
|style="font-size:88%"|November 21–26, 2017
|style="font-size:88%"|2017 U23 World Championships
|style="text-align:left;font-size:88%;"|
 Bydgoszcz, Poland
|-
! style=background:white colspan="7" | 
|-
|Win
|7–0
| style="text-align:left" |  Nathan Tomasello
|style="font-size:88%"|7–4
|style="font-size:88%" rowspan="5" |October 7–8, 2017
|style="font-size:88%" rowspan="2" |2017 US U23 World Team Trials
|style="text-align:left;font-size:88%;" rowspan="5" |
 Rochester, Minnesota
|-
|Win
|6–0
| style="text-align:left" |  Nathan Tomasello
|style="font-size:88%"|8–7
|-
|Win
|5–0
| style="text-align:left" |  Josh Rodriguez
|style="font-size:88%"|8–3
|style="font-size:88%" rowspan="3" |2017 US U23 World Team Trials Challenge Tournament
|-
|Win
|4–0
| style="text-align:left" |  Liam Cronin
|style="font-size:88%"|TF 10–0
|-
|Win
|3–0
| style="text-align:left" |  Alexander Mackall
|style="font-size:88%"|TF 10–0
|-
|Win
|2–0
| style="text-align:left" |  Joey Melendez
|style="font-size:88%"|TF 14–1
|style="font-size:88%"|May 17, 2017
|style="font-size:88%"|2017 Beat The Streets: Times Square
|style="text-align:left;font-size:88%;"  rowspan=2|
 New York City, New York
|-
|Win
|1–0
| style="text-align:left" |  Kheyrolla Ghahramani
|style="font-size:88%"|TF 14–3
|style="font-size:88%"|May 19, 2016
|style="font-size:88%"|2016 Beat The Streets: United in the Square
|-

NCAA record

! colspan="8"| NCAA Division I Record
|-
!  Res.
!  Record
!  Opponent
!  Score
!  Date
!  Event
|-
|Win
|51–3
|align=left| Deon Pleasant
|style="font-size:88%"|Fall
|style="font-size:88%"|November 28, 2021
|style="font-size:88%"|Drexel - Oklahoma State Dual
|-
|Win
|50–3
|align=left| Jake Gliva
|style="font-size:88%"|MD 18–7
|style="font-size:88%"|November 20, 2021
|style="font-size:88%"|Oklahoma State - Minnesota Dual
|-
|Win
|49–3
|align=left| Jackson DiSario
|style="font-size:88%"|7–3
|style="font-size:88%"|November 13, 2021
|style="font-size:88%"|Oklahoma State - Stanford Dual
|-
! style=background:lighgrey colspan=6 |Start of 2021–2022 Season (junior year)
|-
! style=background:lighgrey colspan=6 |End of 2020–2021 Season (sophomore year)
|-
! style=background:white colspan=6 |2021 NCAA Championships  at 133 lbs
|-
|Loss
|48–3
|align=left| Roman Bravo-Young
|style="font-size:88%"|SV 2–4
|style="font-size:88%" rowspan=5|March 18–20, 2021
|style="font-size:88%" rowspan=5|2021 NCAA Division I Wrestling Championships
|-
|Win
|48–2
|align=left| Austin DeSanto
|style="font-size:88%"|3–2
|-
|Win
|47–2
|align=left| Chris Cannon
|style="font-size:88%"|Fall
|-
|Win
|46–2
|align=left| Malyke Hines
|style="font-size:88%"|Fall
|-
|Win
|45–2
|align=left| Cole Rhone
|style="font-size:88%"|MD 16–3
|-
! style=background:white colspan=6 |2021 Big 12 Conference  at 133 lbs
|-
|Win
|44–2
|align=left| Tony Madrigal
|style="font-size:88%"|6–1
|style="font-size:88%" rowspan=4|March 6–7, 2021
|style="font-size:88%" rowspan=4|2021 Big 12 Conference Championships
|-
|Win
|43–2
|align=left| Mosha Schwartz
|style="font-size:88%"|TF 21–5
|-
|Win
|42–2
|align=left| Ty Smith
|style="font-size:88%"|MD 16–4
|-
|Win
|41–2
|align=left| Kellyn March
|style="font-size:88%"|MD 19–7
|-
|Win
|40–2
| style="text-align:left" | Anthony Madrigal 
|style="font-size:88%"|Fall
|style="font-size:88%"|February 21, 2021
|style="font-size:88%"|Oklahoma - Oklahoma State Dual
|-
! style=background:white colspan="6" |2021 Cowboy Challenge Tournament  at 133 lbs
|-
|Win
|39–2
| style="text-align:left" | Ryan Sullivan
|style="font-size:88%"|Fall
|style="font-size:88%" rowspan="4"|February 14, 2021
|style="font-size:88%" rowspan="3"|2021 Cowboy Challenge Tournament
|-
|Win
|38–2
| style="text-align:left" | Job Greenwood
|style="font-size:88%"|Fall
|-
|Win
|37–2
| style="text-align:left" | Cam Valdiviez
|style="font-size:88%"|Fall
|-
|Win
|36–2
| style="text-align:left" | Cameron Valdiviez
|style="font-size:88%"|TF 16–1
|style="font-size:88%"|Cowboy Challenge Extra Matches
|-
! style=background:lighgrey colspan=6 |Start of 2020–2021 Season (sophomore year)
|-
! style=background:lighgrey colspan=6 |End of 2018–2019 Season (freshman year)
|-
! style=background:white colspan="6" |2019 NCAA Championships  at 133 lbs
|-
|Loss
|35–2
| style="text-align:left" | Nick Suriano
|style="font-size:88%"|SV 2–4
|style="font-size:88%" rowspan="5" |March 21–23, 2019
|style="font-size:88%" rowspan="5" |2019 NCAA Division I Wrestling Championships
|-
|Win
|35–1
| style="text-align:left" | Luke Pletcher
|style="font-size:88%"|4–2
|-
|Win
|34–1
| style="text-align:left" | John Erneste
|style="font-size:88%"|MD 11–3
|-
|Win
|33–1
| style="text-align:left" | Matthew Schmitt
|style="font-size:88%"|9–3
|-
|Win
|32–1
| style="text-align:left" | Zack Trampe
|style="font-size:88%"|MD 21–7
|-
! style=background:white colspan="6" |2019 Big 12 Championships  at 133 lbs
|-
|Win
|31–1
| style="text-align:left" | Montorie Bridges
|style="font-size:88%"|4–2
|style="font-size:88%" rowspan="4"|March 9–10, 2019
|style="font-size:88%" rowspan="4"|2019 Big 12 Conference Championships
|-
|Win
|30–1
| style="text-align:left" | Matt Schmitt
|style="font-size:88%"|6–1
|-
|Win
|29–1
| style="text-align:left" | Gary Joint
|style="font-size:88%"|7–3
|-
|Win
|28–1
| style="text-align:left" | Rylee Molitor
|style="font-size:88%"|Fall
|-
|Win
|27–1
| style="text-align:left" | Austin DeSanto 
|style="font-size:88%"|2–0
|style="font-size:88%"|February 24, 2019
|style="font-size:88%"|Iowa – Oklahoma State Dual
|-
|Win
|26–1
| style="text-align:left" | John Erneste 
|style="font-size:88%"|9–2
|style="font-size:88%"|February 16, 2019
|style="font-size:88%"|Oklahoma State – Missouri Dual
|-
|Win
|25–1
| style="text-align:left" | Tony DeCesare 
|style="font-size:88%"|TF 18–2
|style="font-size:88%"|February 8, 2019
|style="font-size:88%"|Air Force – Oklahoma State Dual
|-
|Win
|24–1
| style="text-align:left" | Brandon Paetzell
|style="font-size:88%"|7–1
|style="font-size:88%"|February 3, 2019
|style="font-size:88%"|Lehigh – Oklahoma State Dual
|-
|Win
|23–1
| style="text-align:left" | Jack Skudlarczyk 
|style="font-size:88%"|MD 17–7
|style="font-size:88%"|February 1, 2019
|style="font-size:88%"|Northern Iowa – Oklahoma State Dual
|-
|Win
|22–1
| style="text-align:left" | Austin Gomez 
|style="font-size:88%"|5–4
|style="font-size:88%"|January 27, 2019
|style="font-size:88%"|Iowa State – Oklahoma State Dual
|-
|Loss
|21–1
| style="text-align:left" | Micky Phillippi 
|style="font-size:88%"|1–3
|style="font-size:88%"|January 19, 2019
|style="font-size:88%"|Oklahoma State – Pittsburgh Dual
|-
|Win
|21–0
| style="text-align:left" | Matthew Schmitt
|style="font-size:88%"|8–2
|style="font-size:88%"|January 18, 2019
|style="font-size:88%"|Oklahoma State – West Virginia Dual
|-
|Win
|20–0
| style="text-align:left" | Nick Suriano 
|style="font-size:88%"|TB–2 3–2
|style="font-size:88%"|January 13, 2019
|style="font-size:88%"|Oklahoma State – Rutgers Dual
|-
|Win
|19–0
| style="text-align:left" | Jonathan Gomez 
|style="font-size:88%"|TF 22–7
|style="font-size:88%"|January 12, 2019
|style="font-size:88%"|Oklahoma State – Princeton Dual
|-
! style=background:white colspan="6" |2019 Southern Scuffle  at 133 lbs
|-
|Win
|18–0
| style="text-align:left" | Austin Gomez
|style="font-size:88%"|6–3
|style="font-size:88%" rowspan="5" |January 1–2, 2019
|style="font-size:88%" rowspan="5" |2019 Southern Scuffle
|-
|Win
|17–0
| style="text-align:left" | Sean Nickell
|style="font-size:88%"|TF 18–3
|-
|Win
|16–0
| style="text-align:left" | Jarrett Trombley
|style="font-size:88%"|TF 25–10
|-
|Win
|15–0
| style="text-align:left" | John Twomey
|style="font-size:88%"|Fall
|-
|Win
|14–0
| style="text-align:left" | Chris Wright
|style="font-size:88%"|TF 19–3
|-
! style=background:white colspan="6" |2018 Reno Tournament  at 133 lbs
|-
|Win
|13–0
| style="text-align:left" | Anthony Tutolo
|style="font-size:88%"|10–4
|style="font-size:88%" rowspan="5" |December 20–22, 2018
|style="font-size:88%" rowspan="5" |2018 Reno Tournament of Champions
|-
|Win
|12–0
| style="text-align:left" | Gary Wayne Harding
|style="font-size:88%"|MD 10–2
|-
|Win
|11–0
| style="text-align:left" | Steven Simpson
|style="font-size:88%"|TF 18–2
|-
|Win
|10–0
| style="text-align:left" | Devan Turner
|style="font-size:88%"|DQ
|-
|Win
|9–0
| style="text-align:left" | Vince Zavala
|style="font-size:88%"|TF 24–9
|-
|Win
|8–0
| style="text-align:left" | Sean Cannon 
|style="font-size:88%"|TF 16–1
|style="font-size:88%"|December 16, 2018
|style="font-size:88%"|Oklahoma State – Northern Colorado Dual
|-
|Win
|7–0
| style="text-align:left" | Anthony Madrigal 
|style="font-size:88%"|TF 20–5
|style="font-size:88%"|December 9, 2018
|style="font-size:88%"|Oklahoma – Oklahoma State Dual
|-
|Win
|6–0
| style="text-align:left" | Montorie Brigdes 
|style="font-size:88%"|3–0
|style="font-size:88%"|November 25, 2018
|style="font-size:88%"|Wyoming – Oklahoma State Dual
|-
|Win
|5–0
| style="text-align:left" | Ethan Lizak 
|style="font-size:88%"|6–1
|style="font-size:88%"|November 18, 2018
|style="font-size:88%"|Oklahoma State – Minnesota Dual
|-
|Win
|4–0
| style="text-align:left" | Spencer Huber 
|style="font-size:88%"|TF 19–1
|style="font-size:88%"|November 17, 2018
|style="font-size:88%"|Oklahoma State – South Dakota State Dual
|-
! style=background:white colspan="6" |2018 OK City Open  at 133 lbs
|-
|Win
|3–0
| style="text-align:left" | Andrew Nieman
|style="font-size:88%"|TF 19–4
|style="font-size:88%" rowspan="3" |November 4, 2018
|style="font-size:88%" rowspan="3" |2018 Oklahoma City Open
|-
|Win
|2–0
| style="text-align:left" | Kristofer Hudson
|style="font-size:88%"|TF 19–3
|-
|Win
|1–0
| style="text-align:left" | Cheyenne Davis
|style="font-size:88%"|FF
|-
! style=background:lighgrey colspan=6 |Start of 2018–2019 Season (freshman year)
|-

Stats 

!  Season
!  Year
!  School
!  Rank
!  Weigh Class
!  Record
!  Win
!  Bonus
|-
|2021
|Sophomore
|rowspan=2|Oklahoma State University
|#1 (2nd)
|rowspan=2|133
|13–1
|92.86%
|78.57%
|-
|2019
|Freshman
|#1 (2nd)
|35–2
|94.59%
|54.05%
|-
|colspan="5" style="background:LIGHTGREY"|Career
|style="background:LIGHTGREY"|48–3
|style="background:LIGHTGREY"|94.12%
|style="background:LIGHTGREY"|60.78%

References

External links 
 

1998 births
Living people
People from Sand Springs, Oklahoma
American male sport wrestlers
Wrestlers at the 2014 Summer Youth Olympics
Wrestlers at the 2019 Pan American Games
Pan American Games medalists in wrestling
Pan American Games gold medalists for the United States
Medalists at the 2019 Pan American Games